Herpetoreas is a genus of snakes in the subfamily Natricinae of the family Colubridae. The genus is endemic to South Asia.

Species
The genus Herpetoreas contains the following 7 species, which are recognized as being valid.
Herpetoreas burbrinki  — Burbrink's keelback
Herpetoreas murlen  — Murlen keelback
Herpetoreas pealii  — Assam  keelback, Peal’s keelback, bark brown keelback
Herpetoreas platyceps  — Himalayan keelback
Herpetoreas sieboldii  — Siebold's keelback, Sikkim keelback
Herpetoreas tpser 
Herpetoreas xenura  — Wall's keelback

Nota bene: A binomial authority in parentheses indicates that the species was originally described in a genus other than Herpetoreas.

Etymology
The specific name, burbrinki, is in honor of American herpetologist Frank T. Burbrink.

References

Further reading
Günther A (1860). "Contributions to a Knowledge of the Reptiles of the Himalaya Mountains". Proceedings of the Zoological Society of London 1860: 148-175 + Plates XXV-XXVIII. (Herpetoreas, new genus, p. 156; H. sieboldii, new species, pp. 156–157).

 
Snake genera
Taxa named by Albert Günther